Yamaha XG (EXtended General MIDI) is an extension to the General MIDI standard, created by Yamaha. It is similar in purpose to the Roland GS standard.

Features
Relative to General MIDI, XG gained popularity by increasing the number of available instruments from 128 to 480 (361 in some interpretations) with additional 11 drum kit sounds, and introduced a large set of standard controllers and parameters that composers could employ to achieve greater subtlety and realism in their compositions. The XG also has a synthesizer that provides a 32/64 note polyphonic feature which is shared through the supported 16 MIDI channels. XG has a wide range of sounds to form such complex chords and produces a vast variety of lower synthesizer sounds to choose from.

History
In 1994, Yamaha released the first XG-based product: Yamaha MU80 Tone Generator. In 1995, Yamaha released the first XG-based product for PC users, the DB50XG daughterboard, a Creative Wave Blaster competitor.
In 1996, Yamaha released MU10 external module, basically, a DB50XG in a case and later the SW60XG ISA PC card and the DB51XG a smaller version of the DB50XG daughterboard. Coupled with their tone generator, these devices included an onboard 4MB sound bank chip of sampled instruments and became highly desirable among MIDI fans due to their crisp, high-quality sounds similar to the newer models of Roland Sound Canvas .  These devices feature an effects processing system with individual stereo reverb and chorus effects on any of 16 channels, the ability to route any of the channels through an additional 'insertion' effect, and even guitar amp and wah-wah pedal simulations. Yamaha's in-house songwriters often utilized these tools to demonstrate the power of the XG format, notably recreating Jimi Hendrix leads complete with feedback, flamenco guitar with distinct pick/hammered notes and finger slides, growling saxophones, and even a very convincing sitar .

Discontinued products
The DB50XG, DB51XG, SW60XG and SW1000XG are all discontinued.

The SW1000XG was popular in the professional music industry, and many of Yamaha's amateur and professional keyboards implement either XG or a subset, known as "XGlite".  Many notebooks include the Yamaha YMF7xx chipset which has a scaled-down XG-compatible MIDI synth. The DB60XG, a DB50XG with an analog input, is available only in Japan. .Most XG standard tone generators can switch itself into TG300B mode, which is an emulation of the competing Roland GS standard that allows adequate playback of musical data bearing the GS logo.

The XG-compatible Yamaha S-YXG50 SoftSynthesizer, which is discontinued, is an entirely  software-based MIDI synth. It used a 2 MB or 4 MB wavetable sound set, and was common among non-professional users who needed a cheap, high-quality MIDI synthesizer for purposes such as playing games that rely on MIDI to produce music and sound effects.

Korg compatibility
Korg, due to its close relationship with Yamaha, released three instruments with XG compatibility:

 the NS5R, which offered XG compatibility through an add-in daughterboard;
 the NX5R, electronically similar to the NS5R, except that the daughterboard is part of the instrument;
 the N-series of keyboards and modules, which also offered support for Roland's GS and GM2 standards as well.

Korg was the only manufacturer outside of Yamaha to produce XG-certified instruments.

See also 

 Comparison of MIDI standards
 Yamaha MU-series sound modules

References
 
Get many XG MIDI Files on BlueMan Web Site : XG Creation, French Variety (some with karaoké), International Success, Movies and TV, Jazz, Classic
Article on the S-YXG50 Yamaha Software, including XG sound demos files in .WMA format (in French)
Yamaha's Product Archive – SW1000XG
Theodor Lauppert: Games and General MIDI
Yamaha Manual Library
Yamaha XG programming

MIDI standards
Yamaha Corporation
Japanese inventions
Samplers (musical instrument)